Metrorail or metro rail may refer to:

 Rapid transit, a frequent electric rail system commonly called a metro
 Dhaka Metro Rail, MRT metro service serving Bangladesh's capital city of Dhaka.
 Metrorail (South Africa), a commuter rail system operator in South Africa
 Metrorail Eastern Cape, commuter rail lines serving Port Elizabeth and East London
 Metrorail Gauteng, the commuter rail system in Gauteng province (including Johannesburg and Pretoria)
 Metrorail KwaZulu-Natal, the commuter rail system in Durban
 Metrorail Western Cape, the commuter rail system in Cape Town
 Los Angeles Metro Rail, the rapid transit and light rail system in Los Angeles, California, USA
 Washington Metro, the rapid transit system in Washington, D.C., USA
 Metrorail (Miami-Dade County), the rapid transit system in Miami-Dade County, primarily, Miami, Florida, USA
 METRORail, the light rail system in Houston, Texas, USA
 Valley Metro Rail, the light rail system in the Phoenix metropolitan area in Arizona, USA
 Buffalo Metro Rail, the rapid transit system in Buffalo, New York, USA
 Capital MetroRail, the commuter rail service in Austin, Texas, USA
 New MetroRail, transit improvements to Transperth Trains, the railway network of Perth, Western Australia, Australia
 Bahrain light rail network

See also 
 Metro (disambiguation)